Tadas Šuškevičius (born 22 May 1985 in Vilnius) is a race-walker who competes internationally for Lithuania.

He finished 32nd in the 50 km walk at the 2008 Olympics in Beijing and 45th at the 2012 Olympics. He also competed at the 2009 World Championships in Athletics reaching 17th place and setting a then personal record.  Since then he has also competed at the 2011, 2013 and 2015 World Championships.

Achievements

Personal bests

References

External links
 
 
 
 

1985 births
Living people
Lithuanian male racewalkers
Olympic athletes of Lithuania
Athletes (track and field) at the 2008 Summer Olympics
Athletes (track and field) at the 2012 Summer Olympics
Athletes (track and field) at the 2016 Summer Olympics
World Athletics Championships athletes for Lithuania
Sportspeople from Vilnius